Chaemae may refer to:

Chaemae, an ancient Germanic tribe
Chaemae (Korea), the wife of Kim Yushin